Palmonstown Lafaek is a football club of East Timor.

Affiliated Clubs
 Palmerston FC
 Palmerstown United F.C

References

External links
Palmonstown Lafaek at national-football-teams.com

Football clubs in East Timor
Football
Association football clubs established in 1999
1999 establishments in East Timor